The Christian Democrats for the Republic (CDR) was a Christian-democratic political party in Italy.

The party was formed in February 1998 as a splinter group from the Christian Democratic Centre (CCD), under the leadership of Clemente Mastella, until then CCD president. In June 1998 CDR joined Francesco Cossiga, the United Christian Democrats (CDU) of Rocco Buttiglione, the Segni Pact of Mario Segni, the Liberal Party of Stefano De Luca and some splinters from Forza Italia, National Alliance and Lega Nord to form the Democratic Union for the Republic (UDR).

In February 1999, after clashes between Mastella and Cossiga, the core of the former CDR launched the Union of Democrats for Europe (UDEur).

References

1998 establishments in Italy
1999 disestablishments in Italy
Christian democratic parties in Italy
Catholic political parties
Defunct Christian political parties
Defunct political parties in Italy
Political parties disestablished in 1999
Political parties established in 1998